31641 Cevasco, provisional designation , is a stony Nysian asteroid from the inner regions of the asteroid belt, approximately 3.3 kilometers in diameter. It was discovered on 6 April 1999, by the Lincoln Near-Earth Asteroid Research project at Lincoln Laboratory's Experimental Test Site in Socorro, New Mexico, United States. The asteroid was named for Hannah Cevasco, a 2015 Broadcom MASTERS awardee.

Orbit and classification 

Cevasco orbits the Sun in the inner main-belt at a distance of 2.1–2.8 AU once every 3 years and 10 months (1,390 days). Its orbit has an eccentricity of 0.13 and an inclination of 1° with respect to the ecliptic.

Physical characteristics

Lightcurves 

Three rotational lightcurves of Cevasco were obtained from photometric observations at the Palomar Transient Factory between 2010 and 2014.

Diameter and albedo 

According to the survey carried out by NASA's Wide-field Infrared Survey Explorer with its subsequent NEOWISE mission, Cevasco measures 2.7 kilometers in diameter and its surface has an albedo of 0.311, while the Collaborative Asteroid Lightcurve Link assumes a standard albedo for a stony asteroid of 0.20 and calculates a diameter of 3.3 kilometers with an absolute magnitude of 14.8.

Naming 

This minor planet was named in honor of Hannah Olivia Cevasco (born 2000) finalist in the 2015 Broadcom MASTERS, a math and science competition for middle school students, for her medicine and health sciences project. At the time she attended the St. Charles School in California.

References

External links 
 Asteroid Lightcurve Database (LCDB), query form (info )
 Dictionary of Minor Planet Names, Google books
 Asteroids and comets rotation curves, CdR – Observatoire de Genève, Raoul Behrend
 Discovery Circumstances: Numbered Minor Planets (30001)-(35000) – Minor Planet Center
 
 

031641
031641
Named minor planets
19990406